Chidambarathil Oru Appasamy is a 2005 Indian Tamil-language satirical film directed by Thangar Bachan, who also stars with Navya Nair. It is a remake of the Malayalam film Chinthavishtayaya Shyamala (1998).

Plot 

Elangovan is a school teacher in Chidambaram who is a jack of all trades but master of none. He spends time with friends boozing, gambling, and trying out new businesses that always fail. His wife is Thenmozhi, and they have two daughters. Elangovan's father and father-in-law try to make him responsible towards his family, but he refuses to take up anything serious in life. On everyone's advice, Elangovan goes to Sabarimala after taking Vrath but returns to continue as Sanyasi without being the least bothered about his duties towards his family. Fearing his wife and relatives, he decides to join a mutt, but there also he is unable to sustain. In the meantime, Thenmozhi works hard to educate her children. She is mentally prepared to live without her husband when he returns and pleads with her as usual. This time, she is not willing to pardon him and ignores him. What happens then forms the climax and message of the film.

Cast 
Thangar Bachan as Elangovan
Navya Nair as Thenmozhi
Pyramid Natarajan as Elangovan's father
R. Sundarrajan as Elangovan's father-in-law
Ganja Karuppu
Jagan
Ponnambalam
George Maryan
Pandu
Venba as Kani – Elangovan's daughter
Prabhu Solomon as Elangovan's friend

Production 
Chidambarathil Oru Appasamy is a remake of the Malayalam film Chinthavishtayaya Shyamala (1998). Director Thangar Bachan made his acting debut as lead actor with this film. He stated he had to do the role as no actor was willing to portray the father of two children.

Soundtrack 
The soundtrack was composed by Ilaiyaraaja. The audio launch was held in Chennai on 12 August 2005. The audio was released by director Bharathiraja and was received by Balu Mahendra. Indiaglitz praised the songs saying that "Ilaiyaraaja did a splendid work [..] Maestro has not lost his touch".

Release and reception 
The film's television rights were sold to Jaya TV, and it premiered there on Diwali while still playing in theatres. S. R. Ashok Kumar of The Hindu wrote, "Thankar Bachan passes muster in the lead role. But it is Navya Nair as the beleaguered wife who steals the show". Sify wrote, "The goodness of COA lies in the simple story, an outstanding performance by Navya Nair and soulful music of Ilaiyaraaja. The film with its cute message seeped in real life situations will keep you engrossed". IndiaGlitz wrote, "On the whole Chidambarathil Oru Appasamy is a movie for women folk with a strong message". Behindwoods wrote, "Altogether, the movie is made to target the minds of women without much of commercialism".

References

External links 

2000s satirical films
2000s Tamil-language films
2005 films
Films directed by Thangar Bachan
Films scored by Ilaiyaraaja
Indian satirical films
Tamil remakes of Malayalam films